Beat Feigenwinter (born 5 May 1960) is a Swiss retired professional footballer who played in the 1980s. He played as defender.

Feigenwinter played his youth football with Nordstern Basel and advanced to their first team during the 1979–1980 season as the team achieved promotion to the Nationalliga A. Feigenwinter played with Nordstern for a further four season, despite suffering relegation at the end of the 1981–82 Nationalliga A season.

Feigenwinter then joined FC Basel's first team for their 1984–85 season under head-coach Ernst August Künnecke and Emil Müller. After playing in seven test games Feigenwinter played his domestic league debut for his new club in the away game on 25 August 1984 as Basel won 2–1 against Winterthur.

In his one season with the club, Feigenwinter played a total of 17 games for Basel without scoring a goal. Three of these games were in the Nationalliga A, one in the Swiss Cup and 13 were friendly games.

References

Sources
 
 Die ersten 125 Jahre. Publisher: Josef Zindel im Friedrich Reinhardt Verlag, Basel. 
 Verein "Basler Fussballarchiv" Homepage

FC Nordstern Basel players
FC Basel players
Swiss men's footballers
Association football defenders
1960 births
Living people
Swiss Super League players